"Waterloo" was a number-one hit for country singer Stonewall Jackson in 1959. It was written by John D. Loudermilk and Marijohn Wilkin.

Background
The song tells of three famous people who, because of their actions, "met their Waterloo" – Adam (who ate the "apple"), Napoleon (at the namesake battle), and Tom Dooley (who was hanged for murder).

Chart performance
The single was the most successful of Jackson's career, spending five weeks at number one on the U.S. country music chart. The B-side of "Waterloo", "Smoke Along the Track", reached number 24 on the country chart. "Waterloo" was also Jackson's only top 40 hit, where it stayed on the chart for 16 weeks, peaking at number four on the Billboard Hot 100 pop chart.

References

Columbia Records singles
1959 singles
Stonewall Jackson (musician) songs
Songs written by John D. Loudermilk
Songs written by Marijohn Wilkin
1959 songs
Songs about Napoleon
Songs about soldiers
Songs about criminals
Cultural depictions of Adam and Eve
Song recordings produced by Don Law